Marcus Felix Brudenell Fitch , (5 January 1908 – 2 April 1994) was an English historian and philanthropist.

Fitch was born in Kensington, London in 1908, the only child of provision merchant Hugh Bernard Fitch (1873–1962) and his wife Bertha Violet (née James); his family owned food company Fitch & Son Ltd, later named Fitch Lovell. After finishing his schooling, Fitch joined the family business, and was appointed director in 1930.

During his life he travelled around Europe, with interests in history, antiquities, and archaeology. In 1952 he was elected a Fellow of the Society of Antiquaries of London, and was a member of other organisations.

While he was chairman of the British Record Society (1949–67) he set up the Marc Fitch Fund (1956), an educational charity which funds research and publication, primarily in the UK, in the fields of archaeology, historical geography, history of art, and architecture, heraldry and genealogy.

Fitch was awarded an Honorary DLitt. by the University of Leicester; a university building was named after him, housing the Marc Fitch Library, with a large collection of local history and a collection of national geography. The university's Marc Fitch Historical Institute, on Salisbury Road, is a centre for urban historical research named after Fitch.

Between 1975 and 1988, the Marc Fitch Award for Bibliography was funded by Fitch. Since 1956, the Marc Fitch lectures have been given by guest speakers, including David Starkey. During the 1970s, Fitch helped set up the Aurelius Trust, a charity which makes donations in the interests of the conservation of culture.

In 1973 the British School at Athens built a laboratory with Fitch's backing, named after him.

Fitch died in 1994 in Andover, Hampshire.

References

1908 births
1994 deaths
English philanthropists
English antiquarians
20th-century English historians
20th-century British philanthropists
Fellows of the Society of Antiquaries of London